Bill McCamley is an American politician who served as the secretary of the New Mexico Department of Workforce Solutions from 2019 to 2021. Previously, he served as a Democratic member of the New Mexico House of Representatives from 2013 to 2018.

Early life and education 
McCamley was born in Pusan, South Korea while his father was serving in the United States Army. He earned a Bachelor of Arts in government from New Mexico State University and a Master of Public Policy from the Harvard Kennedy School.

Career 
Before serving in the New Mexico House of Representatives, McCamley was a Dona Ana County commissioner from 2005 to 2008.

McCamley was a candidate for the Democratic nomination for New Mexico State Auditor in the 2018 election. He lost the Democratic primary election to Brian Colón. McCamley has been an outspoken advocate of legalizing recreational marijuana in the state of New Mexico.

References

External links
 
Legislative page

1978 births
Living people
State cabinet secretaries of New Mexico
County commissioners in New Mexico
Democratic Party members of the New Mexico House of Representatives
People from Doña Ana County, New Mexico
Harvard Kennedy School alumni
21st-century American politicians
New Mexico State University alumni